John Christopher Corne (5 July 1942 – 17 May 1999) was a linguist from New Zealand and a specialist in creole languages. He was educated at Whangarei Boys' High School from 1956 to 1960

Publications
1970. Essai de grammaire du créole mauricien, Auckland : Linguistic Society of New Zealand.
1977. Seychelles Creole grammar: elements for Indian Ocean Proto-Creole reconstruction, Tübingen: Verlag Narr.
1982 (with Philip Baker), Isle de France Creole: Affinities and Origins, Ann Arbor: Karoma.
1988. "Mauritian Creole Reflexives", Journal of Pidgin and Creole Languages, Volume 3, Number 1, 1988, pp. 69–94 
1999. From French to Creole, Battlebridge Publications (Westminster Creolistics).

See also
Mauritian Creole

References

Linguists from New Zealand
1942 births
1999 deaths
People educated at Whangarei Boys' High School
20th-century linguists